Niviarsiat is a mountain in the Kujalleq municipality, southern Greenland.

Geography
This mountain is a 1,300 m high summit with multiple peaks rising to the northeast of the Kiattuut Sermiat glacier.

Niviarsiat is located near the southern end of the Greenland ice sheet and is conspicuous.

History
Wilhelm August Graah during his 1829 expedition, thought that he could see the Niviarsiat peaks from a hilltop of Griffenfeldt Island in the eastern coast of Greenland:

Despite the distance across the ice sheet, other authors regard Graah's conclusion as correct.

See also
 List of mountains in Greenland

References

Mountains of Greenland
Kujalleq